Irqah Hospital, also at times Ergah Hospital is a now-defunct and abandoned health care facility in the Irqah neighborhood of Riyadh, Saudi Arabia. Completed in 1987 as a private medical facility, it housed a number of Kuwaiti families in the early 1990s and treated combatants during the Gulf war. It was reopened in 1993 when it was rehabilitated as a hospital and functioned for nearly 8 years prior to ceasing operations around 2001. It is considered to be one of the most haunted sites in Riyadh where several incidents of unusual paranormal activities have been reported by residents living in its vicinity.

History 
Irqah Hospital was constructed in 1987 as a private medical facility by the Saudi Ministry of Health and funded by Saudi Oger. It housed several Kuwaiti families and treated combatants during the 1990-1991 Gulf crisis. It was reopened in 1993 as a hospital and served for nearly eight before closing down in 2001. Since its disestablishment, the site is considered to be haunted by jinns by its nearby residents and have complained of strange paranormal activities.

2012 trespassing by ghost hunters 

In May 2012, Al Eqtisadiah reported that a group of 30 young Saudis orchestrated an incursion on numerous suspected haunted locations across cities in Saudi Arabia, including the Irqah Hospital and termed the raid as "The National Day to Invade Dwelling Places of Jinn". The men stormed the hospital and set it ablaze, damaging 60% of the building in the process before the arrival of Saudi Civil Defense who extinguished the fire. Later, the police was alerted and a sizeable unit was mobilized towards the site after which they dispersed some of the trespassers. Soon after the incident, the Saudi Ministry of Health stated that it had revoked the affiliation of the hospital long ago as the building was beyond repair and inappropriate for use and relinquished any claim over the hospital.

Renovation attempts 
In 2014, after two years of investigation, the National Anti-Corruption Commission (Nazaha) submitted the report to the late King Abdullah in order to decide the fate of the abandoned health care facility.

References 

Hospital buildings completed in 1987
1993 establishments in Saudi Arabia
Hospitals established in 1993
Hospitals disestablished in 2001
2001 disestablishments in Saudi Arabia
Hospitals in Saudi Arabia
Defunct hospitals
Organisations based in Riyadh